Central Valley Christian Schools is a private Christian school in Visalia, California, United States. It was established as an elementary school in 1979 with a high school being added in 1982.

Notable alumni
Stephen Vogt, Major League Baseball player. World Series Champion (2021 - Atlanta Braves)

References

External links

Christian schools in California
Education in Visalia, California
1979 establishments in California
Educational institutions established in 1979